The second Women's U.S. Cup tournament held in 1996, were joined by four teams: Canada, China, Japan and USA.

Matches

Final placing

References

1995
1996 in women's association football
1996 in American women's soccer
1996 in Canadian soccer
1996 in Chinese football
1996 in Japanese football
May 1996 sports events in the United States